Jane Godia is a Kenyan journalist, editor, trainer, and a member of the Commonwealth group observer for Sierra Leone Elections. She is a former acting Managing Director of African Gender and Media Initiative (GEM) Trust and Director at Women In News, Africa... She worked as an editor at The African Woman and Child Feature Services. Godia is also  a former Deputy Managing Editor at the Standard Group and a graduate of the University of Nairobi.

References 

Living people
Kenyan journalists
Kenyan women journalists
21st-century journalists
Year of birth missing (living people)